Des Plaines  is a city in Cook County, Illinois, United States. Per the 2020 census, the population was 60,675. The city is a suburb of Chicago and is located just north of O'Hare International Airport. It is situated on and is named after the Des Plaines River, which runs through the city just east of its downtown area.

History 
Potawatomi, Ottawa, and Ojibwe (Chippewa) Native American tribes inhabited the Des Plaines River Valley prior to Europeans' arrival. When French explorers and missionaries arrived in the 1600s in what was then the Illinois Country of New France, they named the waterway La Rivière des Plaines (English translation: "Plains River") as they felt that trees on the river resembled European plane trees. The first white settlers came from the eastern United States in 1833, after the 1833 Treaty of Chicago was negotiated, followed by many German immigrants during the 1840s and '50s. In the 1850s, the land in this area was purchased by the Illinois and Wisconsin Land Company along a railroad line planned between Chicago and Janesville, Wisconsin. In 1852, the developers built a steam-powered mill next to the river to cut local trees into railroad ties. Socrates Rand then bought the mill and converted it into a grist mill, which attracted local farmers. The Illinois and Wisconsin Railroad made its first stop in the area in the fall of 1854.

In 1857, the Chicago, St. Paul, and Fond du Lac Railroad began running its route, stopping near the mill on the Des Plaines river, where a small business section had grown up. The railroad platted the prospective town of Rand at the site. In 1859, the Chicago and North Western Railway purchased the rail line, giving the train station the name "Des Plaines".  In 1869, the Rand subdivision's name was changed to Des Plaines, and the village of Des Plaines was then incorporated.

Des Plaines was reincorporated in 1873 and elected a village board the following year. Local brick manufacturer Franklin Whitcomb served as the first Village President.

In 1925, village residents voted to convert to a city form of government and annexed the village of Riverview to the south. Subsequent annexations included the Orchard Place area in 1956. The city experienced rapid growth after World War II and with the opening of nearby O'Hare International Airport.

Des Plaines was the site of Ray Kroc's first McDonald's franchise, which opened in 1955.  The restaurant was demolished in 1984, and a replica was built on the site as a museum dedicated to McDonald's history.  In 2017, McDonald's announced plans to demolish the building due to repeated flooding. The building has since been demolished.

In 1979, Des Plaines was the site of the accident of American Airlines Flight 191, in which a McDonnell Douglas DC-10 departing from O'Hare lost an engine and wing material and crashed near a local trailer park just north of Touhy Avenue. All 271 people on board the aircraft died, as did two workers at a repair garage. Two more, along with three civilians, were injured.

In 2008, the Illinois Gaming Board awarded the state's 10th casino license to Midwest Gaming and Entertainment LLC to build a  casino on approximately  adjacent to the Tri-State Tollway at the northwest corner of Devon Avenue and Des Plaines River Road. Midwest Gaming received the award despite having the lowest bid because other bidders were found unacceptable by the Board, with one board member finding no bidders acceptable. The city approved zoning in early 2010, and the casino opened in July 2011 as Rivers Casino.

On July 29th, 2022, the third largest winning lotto ticket in US history valued at $1.34 billion was sold at a Speedway gas station in Des Plaines near O'Hare Airport on Touhy Ave. , the winning ticket holder has not come forward or been identified.

Geography

Des Plaines is traversed by two interstate highways – I-90 (the Northwest Tollway) and I-294 (the Tri-State Tollway).

Des Plaines is named for the Des Plaines River, which flows through it.  The name is from 18th-century French referencing the American sycamore  which resembles the European plane tree.

Portions of Des Plaines are underlain by the "Des Plaines Disturbance", an area in which the layers of sedimentary rock are highly abnormal. This probably represents an ancient meteorite crater,  beneath the town. The bedrock was highly fractured by the impact, with large blocks of sediment upended. The crater was eventually filled by glacial activity, so that no trace now remains on the surface.

Addresses in the city limits of Des Plaines have their own numbering system. Areas in unincorporated Maine Township have Des Plaines postal addresses that follow the Chicago numbering system. Devon Avenue in Des Plaines is 3200 South, while it is 6400 North in Chicago. Golf Road runs through a large unincorporated area as 9600 North with a Des Plaines mailing address but is 0 North/South when entering the Des Plaines city limits. As sections become incorporated, they take on the city numbering system. For instance in 2003, land at 9661 West Golf Road, Des Plaines, became 2323 East Golf Road, Des Plaines, when it was formally incorporated into the city limits.  The largest unincorporated areas are in the O'Hare area and east of the Tri-State Tollway.

Demographics

As of the 2020 census there were 60,675 people, 21,849 households, and 14,785 families residing in the city. The racial makeup of the city was 62.42% White, 15.23% Asian, 2.40% African American, 1.01% Native American, 0.02% Pacific Islander, 9.24% from other races, and 9.67% from two or more races. Hispanic or Latino of any race were 20.53% of the population.

There were 21,849 households, out of which 48.42% had children under the age of 18 living with them, 52.63% were married couples living together, 10.26% had a female householder with no husband present, and 32.33% were non-families. 27.42% of all households were made up of individuals, and 14.14% had someone living alone who was 65 years of age or older. The average household size was 3.24 and the average family size was 2.62.

The city's age distribution consisted of 20.4% under the age of 18, 6.5% from 18 to 24, 25.7% from 25 to 44, 28.7% from 45 to 64, and 18.8% who were 65 years of age or older. The median age was 42.8 years. For every 100 females, there were 94.8 males. For every 100 females age 18 and over, there were 92.0 males.

The median income for a household in the city was $73,639, and the median income for a family was $93,205. Males had a median income of $52,530 versus $36,173 for females. The per capita income for the city was $37,220. About 5.0% of families and 7.9% of the population were below the poverty line, including 10.0% of those under age 18 and 9.3% of those age 65 or over.

Note: the US Census treats Hispanic/Latino as an ethnic category. This table excludes Latinos from the racial categories and assigns them to a separate category. Hispanics/Latinos can be of any race.

A notable number of Cook County residents reside in unincorporated areas which use a Des Plaines zip code. These areas are densely populated and consist primarily of high density, multi-family housing with a very high percentage of foreign born residents.  In the 2000 census the population of these unincorporated areas of Cook County assigned Des Plaines zip codes was 25,617. This unincorporated area has never been a part of the city of Des Plaines, and the majority of this area is separated from the actual city of Des Plaines by a belt of Forest Preserve lands and a Tollway barrier created by I-294.

Economy

Largest employers
According to the city's 2021 Comprehensive Annual Financial Report, the major employers in the city are Rivers Casino (Des Plaines), Universal Oil Products, Oakton Community College, Sysco Food Services, Juno Lighting, Holy Family Medical Center, Wheels Inc. (passenger car and truck leasing), and LSG Sky Chefs.

China Airlines maintains their Chicago office in Des Plaines. It was previously located in Michigan Plaza in the Chicago Loop.

Arts and culture

 Big Bend Lake, a  lake linked to the Des Plaines River by a spillway and a fishing destination
 Des Plaines History Center
 Des Plaines Methodist Camp Ground, listed on the National Register of Historic Places, predates the city (founded 1860) and is still active every summer with concerts, day camps, swimming & recreation, picnics, etc.
 Des Plaines Public Library
 Des Plaines Theater, historic 1925 movie theater
 Lake Opeka in Lake Park
 Mystic Waters Family Aquatic Center 
 Maryville Academy, center for under-privileged children, which hosts the Chicagoland Sports Hall of Fame
 Rivers Casino

Education
College campuses include:
Oakton Community College, opened in 1969; a community college with campuses in Skokie and Des Plaines

Public school districts include:
Elementary and middle school: District 62, District 59 and District 63
High school: District 207 with Maine West High School

Private schools include:
 
Immanuel Lutheran School
St. Zachary School
The Science and Arts Academy
The Willows Academy

Infrastructure

Major highways
Major highways in Des Plaines include:

Interstate Highways
 Interstate 90
 Interstate 294

US Highways
 US 12
 US 14
 US 45

Illinois Highways
 Route 58
 Route 72
 Route 83

Notable people 

 Perry Caravello, actor and comedian, lived in Des Plaines as a child.
 Eileen Fisher, clothing designer. She was raised in Des Plaines.
 Adrian Fulle, managing member of film production company
 Shawn Green, right fielder with the Toronto Blue Jays, LA Dodgers, Arizona Diamondbacks, and New York Mets; two time all-star; born in Des Plaines.
 Peter M. Hoffman, politician who served as Cook County Sheriff, Cook County Coroner, and a member of the Cook County Board of Commissioners
 Michael Kleen, folklorist, publisher, and social commentator
 Tyler Ladendorf, second baseman with Oakland Athletics
 Jill Morgenthaler, US Army colonel; politician; Homeland Security adviser in Illinois; lived in Des Plaines
 Pelican, a post-metal band.
 Robert Reed, actor (The Brady Bunch, 1969–1974); grew up in Des Plaines
 Jacky Rosen, United States Senator from Nevada (2019–present). She was raised in Des Plaines until her family moved to Arlington Heights, Illinois when she was in high school.
 Rick Zombo, defenseman with the Detroit Red Wings, St. Louis Blues, and Boston Bruins; born in Des Plaines
 Marty Moylan, an Illinois State Representative who served as Mayor of Des Plaines until 2013. 
 Matthew Bogusz, an advertising executive who was elected Mayor of Des Plaines at age 26.

In popular culture
The majority of the hit 1985 film The Breakfast Club was filmed at the now-defunct Maine North High School located in unincorporated Des Plaines.

The tree used in the album cover of the 100 Gecs album 1000 Gecs is located in Des Plaines.

See also

References

External links

City of Des Plaines official website

 
Chicago metropolitan area
Cities in Illinois
Populated places established in 1852
Cities in Cook County, Illinois
1852 establishments in Illinois